Torchwood is a British science-fiction television programme and subfranchise of the Whoniverse.

Torchwood may also refer to:

 wood used for torches
 Amyris, a genus of tree referred to as torchwood
 Ixora brachiata, a species of tree, see Kinnerasani Wildlife Sanctuary

Whoniverse
 Torchwood (audio drama series)
 Torchwood (comics)
 Torchwood Institute, a fictional organization found in the Whoniverse, the titular institution of the eponymous television show Torchwood
 Torchwood Hub, a fictional building in the Whoniverse, HQ featured in the TV programme
 Torchwood Magazine, a British print magazine
 Torchwood: Original Television Soundtrack, a 2008 album

Other uses
 , an Ailanthus-class net laying ship, AN-55/YN-74

See also

 Torchwood Declassified, a companion TV programme to Torchwood
 Whoniverse
 Doctor Who (disambiguation)
 
 Torch (disambiguation)
 Wood (disambiguation)